The San Beda Red Lions is the collegiate varsity basketball team of the San Beda University that plays in the NCAA. The juniors basketball team is called the Red Cubs of San Beda University–Rizal, while the women's varsity basketball team is called the Red Lionesses. The latter plays in the Women's National Collegiate Athletic Association.

San Beda is the only founding member of the NCAA left in the league.

Name

San Beda is named after the Venerable Bede of England. In honor of Venerable Bede who is an English man, the school chose the Red Lion Rampant which is the heraldic symbol of the ancient Scots/English for courage as part of its school logo. San Beda pays tribute to the courage of the Benedictine monks by adopting the Red Lion, the symbol of courage in the Catholic tradition and in the land of St. Bede.

Basketball

NCAA Season 94 Men's Basketball roster

Team depth chart

NCAA Season 93 Juniors' Basketball roster

History

Red Lions Battlecry

2006: End 28 @ 82 – for their quest to conclude the 28 years of seniors basketball championship title drought
2007: Back-to-back @ 83 – for their bid to have a back-to-back title
2008: DYNASthree – for their bid to gain back-to-back-to-back titles
2009: Animo Quatro – their bid to have the first ever 4-peat
2010: REDemption – for their bid to regain the NCAA title in 2010
2011: REDomination – for their bid to have a back-to-back title again in 2011
2012: R3peat The 3peat – for their bid to have a back-to-back-to-back title since 2009
2013: Roar For Four – for their bid to have their school's first ever 4-peat
2014: Go San Beda Five – for their bid for that unprecedented 5-peat
2015: Witness 6reatness – for their bid to have the first ever 6-peat in NCAA history
2016: REDemption 2.0 – for their bid to regain the NCAA title and the quest for the 20th overall basketball title
2017: #RoarAsOne for banner 21 – for their bid to have a back-to-back title, 21st overall
2018: Defend The Thron3 – for their bid to have a back-to-back-to-back title, 22nd overall
2019: Four The Win – for their bid to have a 4-peat title, 23rd overall

Red Cubs Battlecry

2012: Roar For More – for their bid to have their school's first ever 4-peat
2013: Drive for FiVe – for their bid to have their school's first ever 5-peat
2014: ThisSixIt – for their bid for that unprecedented 6-peat
2015: Red Cubs Never S7op – for their bid to have the first ever 7-peat in NCAA history
2016: Make8Happen – for their bid to have the first ever 8-peat in NCAA history
2017: #REDemption – for their bid to regain the juniors basketball title
2019: #LetsBring1tBack - for their bid to clinch the juniors basketball title after a four year drought

Notable players

Red Lions

 
 Robert Bolick
 Charles Borck
 Javee Mocon
 Pong Escobal
 Riego Gamalinda
 Borgie Hermida
 Abe King
 Garvo Lanete
 Frankie Lim
 Carlos Loyzaga
 Chito Loyzaga
 Joey Loyzaga
 Dave Marcelo
 Ogie Menor
 Jake Pascual
 Kyle Pascual
 Alberto Reynoso
 Rome dela Rosa
 Anthony Semerad
 David Semerad
 Baser Amer
 Yousif Aljamal
 Anjo Caram
 Arthur dela Cruz
 Mat Ranillo III

Red Cubs

 
  Ryan Monteclaro
  Claiford Arao
  Giboy Babilonia 
  Yuri Escueta 
  Alfonzo Gotladera 
  Magnum Membrere
  Nico Salva 
  LA Tenorio 
  Tyrone Bautista 
  Joshua Caracut
  JV Casio
  Teddy Monasterio
  Evan Nelle
  Dindo Pumaren 
  LA Revilla 
  Ren-Ren Ritualo 
  Gerry Esplana 
  Axel Iñigo
  Ronald Magtulis 
  Arvin Tolentino
  Adven Jess Diputado
  Germy Mahinay
  Jolly Escobar
  Chris Javier
  James Martinez
  Jay Agbayani
  Toti Almeda
  Eric Altamirano
  Mike Bravo
  Paul Du
  Ronnie Magsanoc 
  Joey Mendoza
  Xavier Nunag
  Alvin Padilla
  Benjie Paras
  Duane Salvatera
  Jonjon Tabique
  Udoy Belmonte
  JM Lagumen
  Aljon Mariano
  Chris Calaguio 
  Samboy Lim 
  Baldwin Combate
  Christian Coronel
 Mark Mañosca
 Bong Salvador
 Jeric Raval
 JR Alba
 Macky De Joya
 Serafin Hilvano
 Bebe Terminez
 Von Chavez

Retired Number

Football
Dubbed the "Red Booters", the San Beda football team has been a consistent championship contender for the past few years in the NCAA.  The seniors team has won the NCAA championship for the last 6 years and has won a total of 14 championships, second only to De La Salle University in all-time wins.

Volleyball

Women's volleyball roster
 NCAA Season 95

 Head Coach: Nemesio Gavino
 Assistant coach: Richard Cuevas

Men's volleyball roster
 NCAA Season 93

 Head coach: Ernesto Pamilar
 Assistant coach: Alegro Carpio

Boys' volleyball roster
 NCAA Season 91

Coach: Nemesio Gavino

Beach volleyball
NCAA Season 93
Women's
 Trisha Mae S. Paras
 Maria Jeziela C. Viray
 Maria Nieza C. Viray

Men's
 Jomaru Amagan
 Mark Christian S. Enciso
 Ferdinand T. Ulibas Jr.
 Adrian D. Viray

Juniors
 Lance Andrei de Castro
 Franz Nico Dizon
 Juwan Miguel Ilagan

Notable players

Women's 
 NCAA Season 93 beach volleyball champions
- Trisha Mae Paras, Maria Jeziela Viray, Maria Nieza Viray
 Maria Jeziela Viray
- NCAA Season 93 beach volleyball MVP
 Cesca Racraquin
- NCAA Season 92 Rookie of the Year
 Maria Nieza Viray
- NCAA Season 91 Rookie of the Year
 Frances Molina
 Janine Marciano
 Andrea Abaya

Men's 
 Limuel Patenio
- NCAA Season 93 2nd Best Middle Blocker
 Mark Christian Encisco
- NCAA Season 93 Best Opposite Spiker

WNCAA
The San Beda Alabang girls' volleyball team won the 39th WNCAA championship title. They are the first juniors team to bring a volleyball championship title to their alma mater.

Soft tennis
The San Beda's women's soft tennis team, headed by team captain Alyana Victoria and head coach Jovy Mamawal, won two consecutive titles in the NCAA soft tennis event in Seasons 90 and 91. Aside from their championships, The Red Lionesses represented the country in the University Soft Tennis Championships in 2015 held at South Korea.

See also
 San Beda University
 San Beda–Letran rivalry
 San Beda–Perpetual rivalry
 San Beda–San Sebastian rivalry

References

External links 
 San Beda Sports San Beda Support Site
 WNCAA official website
 San Beda College official website
 San Beda College Alabang official website of the Alabang Campus
 Washington Bedans San Beda alumni association in Washington, D.C.
 San Beda Basketball League San Beda Red Lions Website
 San Beda GS'78-HS'82 San Beda Batch GS'78-HS'82 Alumni Website "We're Back on Top@82"
  ¡Ánimo San Beda! More Bedan traditions explained
 Red Lions NCAA 2008 Champs 3-PEAT!!! Beda7882 Alumni Website
 San Beda relives Caloy Loyzaga’s golden era Beda7882 Alumni Website

National Collegiate Athletic Association (Philippines) teams
Former Philippine Basketball League teams
Red Lions
College sports teams in Metro Manila